The Michigan District is one of the 35 districts of the Lutheran Church–Missouri Synod (LCMS), and comprises the U.S. state of Michigan with the exception of the western half of the Upper Peninsula, which is in the North Wisconsin District. In addition, nineteen Michigan congregations are in the non-geographic English District. The Michigan District includes approximately 380 congregations and missions, subdivided into 44 circuits, as well as 76 preschools, 83 elementary schools and 7 high schools. Baptized membership in district congregations is approximately 212,000. It is by far the largest of the Synod's districts, exceeding the size of the next largest district by over 83,000 members (Northern Illinois District)
and by 20 congregations (Texas District).

The Michigan District is the renamed remnant of what was originally called the Northern District, one of the Synod's four original districts formed in 1854. The Wisconsin and Minnesota portions of the district were separated in 1875, creating the Northwestern District. From 1875 to 1879, Ontario was included in the Northern District, but it was split off to form the Canada District. The Northern District was renamed the Michigan District in 1881. District offices are located in Ann Arbor, Michigan. Delegates from each congregation meet in convention every three years to elect the district president, vice presidents, circuit counselors, a board of directors, and other officers. The Rev. David P.E. Maier was elected president of the district at the 2009 District Convention, succeeding the Rev. Dr. C. William Hoesman. The 99th Regular Convention was held on June 28 - July 1, 2009 at Concordia University, Ann Arbor with the theme "Celebrate Jesus" (from Phil. 2:9-11). The 100th Regular Convention will be held June 24–27, 2012 at Concordia University, Ann Arbor.

Concordia University, Ann Arbor, part of the LCMS Concordia University System, is located within the district.

Presidents
Rev. Ottomar Fuerbringer, 1854–72
Rev. J. A. Hügli, 1872–75
Rev. Ottomar Fuerbringer, 1875–82
Rev. M. J. Schmidt, 1882–91
Rev. Gustav Ernst Spiegel, 1891–1912
Rev. T. E. W. Engelder, 1912–14
Rev. Emanuel August Mayer, 1915–24
Rev. John Jacob Frederick Schinnerer, 1924–42
Rev. Andrew Zeile, 1942–57
Rev. W. Harry Krieger, 1957–65
Rev. Edwin C. Weber, 1965–69
Rev. Richard L. Schlecht, 1969–85
Rev. John L. Heins, 1985–97
Rev. C. William Hoesman, 1997–2009
Rev. Dr. David P.E. Maier, 2009–2022
Rev. David A. Davis, 2022-present

References

External links
Michigan District web site
LCMS: Michigan District
LCMS Congregation Directory
Verhandlungen der fünfundzwanzigsten Jahresversammlung des Michigan-distrikts der deutschen evang.-luth. Synode von Missouri, Ohio und Andern Staaten (Starts with Northern District, then Michigan district, 1880–1892)
Verhandlungen der vierunddreissigsten Jahresversammlung des Michigan-distrikts der deutschen evang.-lutherischen Synode von Missouri, Ohio und Andern Staaten (1894–1906)

Lutheran Church–Missouri Synod districts
Lutheranism in Michigan
Religious organizations established in 1854
Lutheran districts established in the 19th century
1854 establishments in Michigan